The Anguilla Act 1980 was an Act of the Parliament of the United Kingdom, which received royal assent on the 16 December 1980. The Act made provisions for the government of the United Kingdom to administer Anguilla, and  pass laws for the territory or on its behalf. The Act also ended the Associated State of St Kitts, Nevis and Anguilla, which was created in turn by a federal act in 1882. Section 1(1) and Section 2(2) were repealed in 1995.

References

UK Legislation 

United Kingdom Acts of Parliament 1980
Anguillan law